Joanne Cantwell (born 30 September 1979) is an Irish sports presenter.

Personal life
Cantwell was raised in Dublin, one of five daughters. She studied journalism at Dublin City University. Cantwell is married with two daughters and lives in Ongar, Co. Dublin.

Sporting career
Cantwell participated in a number of competitive sports from her early teens. She played ladies' Gaelic football for the Dublin county team, and was part of the team that won Dublin's first-ever senior Leinster Ladies Senior Football Championship. She was named Young Dublin Player of the Year in 1997 and was an All-Star nominee in 1998.

Journalism career
Cantwell began her journalism career while still in university, covering weekend sport on radio station FM104. In 2001, she joined the independent Irish channel TV3, where she produced news bulletins and presented the Sports Tonight show.

She then joined state broadcaster RTÉ. Cantwell is the presenter of weekly rugby magazine programme Against the Head on RTÉ2, and was also a match reporter on Premier Soccer Saturday. During the summer months, Cantwell began working as a reporter on The Sunday Game, Raidió Teilifís Éireann's main Gaelic games television programme shown on RTÉ2 every Sunday during the Football Championship and Hurling Championship seasons.

In April 2016, Cantwell was the first woman to anchor RTÉ's coverage of the Champions League.

In February 2018, Cantwell was named as the new presenter of The Sunday Game following popular studio host Michael Lyster's retirement from RTÉ at the end of the 2018 GAA season.

Feud with Joe Brolly

In the beginning of 2019, she was seen to be at loggerheads with prominent GAA pundit Joe Brolly, who mused sarcastically that it was "going to be an extremely long year". 
Although, Brolly often is celebrated for "butting heads" with fellow pundits and presenters and many saw the comment as merely lighthearted banter between two broadcasters.

After a minor incident with fellow GAA pundit Pat Spillane involving shoulder patting, Brolly was dropped from future RTÉ coverage of GAA games. Brolly claims that Cantwell had "lost all confidence" in his ability as a broadcaster and as a pundit.

References

1979 births
Living people
Gaelic games writers and broadcasters
RTÉ television presenters
Dublin inter-county ladies' footballers
Alumni of Dublin City University